Britain's Most Evil Killers and World's Most Evil Killers are British crime television programmes on Pick (TV channel).
First aired in 2017, the series are narrated by Fred Dinenage, and focus on the most notorious and depraved serial killers that were convicted during the past 50 years.

Format overview
Each episode examines the case of a selected murderer, starting from an overview of the committed crime, the background, evidences collected and a number of interviews with police investigators, reporters, family members and relatives of the victims, to explain the facts in detail.

The series synopsis include expert examinations and evaluations from 2 main recurring specialists throughout all 6 seasons - professor of criminology Elizabeth Yardley, journalist and crime author Geoffrey Wansell - along with other criminologists, criminal psychologists, lawyers, journalists, reporters, law enforcement officers.

Statements from the investigations, reports from the trial, and the final conviction are outlined at the end of each episode, with a closing sentence from the narrator confirming why the profiled murderer shall always be remembered as one of the most evil killers.

Programmes
Britain's Most Evil Killers 
World's Most Evil Killers

Britain’s Most Evil Killers Series

Series 1
 S01E01 Steve Wright
 S01E02 Peter Sutcliffe
 S01E03 Ian Huntley
 S01E04 Fred & Rose West
 S01E05 Levi Bellfield
 S01E06 Joanna Dennehy
 S01E07 Stephen Griffiths
 S01E08 Dennis Nilsen
 S01E09 Stuart Hazell
 S01E10 Peter Tobin
 S01E11 Michael Ryan
 S01E12 Beverley Allitt

Series 2
 S02E01 Mick Philpott
 S02E02 Mark Bridger
 S02E03 Stephen Port
 S02E04 Raoul Moat
 S02E05 Roy Whiting
 S02E06 John Duffy & David Mulcahy
 S02E07 Tracie Andrews
 S02E08 Steven Grieveson
 S02E09 Stefano Brizzi
 S02E010 Danilo Restivo

Series 3
 S03E01 Vincent Tabak
 S03E02 Robert Black
 S03E03 Angus Sinclair
 S03E04 Trevor Hardy
 S03E05 David Heiss
 S03E06 John Cooper
 S03E07 Colin Ireland
 S03E08 Christopher Halliwell
 S03E09 Derrick Bird
 S03E010 Mark Hobson

Series 4
 S04E01 Harold Shipman
 S04E02 Robert Napper
 S04E03 Stephen Seddon
 S04E04 Dale Cregan
 S04E05 Anthony Arkwright
 S04E06 John Sweeney
 S04E07 Andrzej Kunowski
 S04E08 Arthur Hutchinson
 S04E09 Peter Moore
 S04E010 Andrew Dawson

Series 5
 S05E01 Stephen Farrow
 S05E02 Victor Farrant
 S05E03 Kenneth Regan & William Horncy
 S05E04 Russell Bishop
 S05E05 Phillip Austin
 S05E06 Jason Marshall
 S05E07 Sabah Khan
 S05E08 Colin Pitchfork
 S05E09 Ali Qazimaj
 S05E10 Billy Dunlop

Series 6
 S06E01 Stuart Campbell
 S06E02 Trimaan Harry Dhillon
 S06E03 Jamie Reynolds
 S06E04 Sarah Williams & Katrina Walsh
 S06E05 Lee Ford
 S06E06 Pawel Relowicz
 S06E07 Daniel Gonzalez
 S06E08 Geoffrey Evans & John Shaw
 S06E09 Mark Martin
S06E10 Malcolm Green

Series 7
 S07E01 Lewis Daynes
 S07E02 Ben Field
 S07E03 Nathan Matthews
 S07E04 John Cannan
 S07E05 David Bieber
 S07E06 Ian Stewart
 S07E07 Zahid Zaman
 S07E08 Stephen Unwin & William McFall
 S07E09 Colin Campbell
 S07E10 Adrian Prout

World’s Most Evil Killers Series

Series 1
 S01E01 Fritz Honka
 S01E02 Joachim Kroll
 S01E03 Volker Eckert
 S01E04 Marc Dutroux
 S01E05 John Wayne Gacy
 S01E06 Jeffrey Dahmer
 S01E07 Ed Gein
 S01E08 Thierry Paulin

Series 2
 S02E01 Edmund Kemper
 S02E02 Richard Ramirez
 S02E03 Dorothea Puente
 S02E04 Charles Ng & Leonard Lake
 S02E05 Cary Stayner
 S02E06 Rodney Alcala
 S02E07 Horst Kröner
 S02E08 Wolfgang Schmidt
 S02E09 Jack Unterweger
 S02E010  Paweł Tuchlin

Series 3
 S03E01 Ted Bundy
 S03E02 Aileen Wuornos
 S03E03 Bobby Joe Long
 S03E04 Gary Ridgway
 S03E05 Dennis Rader
 S03E06 Diane Downs
 S03E07 Robert Berdella
 S03E08 Robert Lee Yates
 S03E09 Danny Rolling
 S03E010 Karol Kot

Series 4
 S04E01 Todd Kohlhepp
 S04E02 David Berkowitz
 S04E03 Robert Ben Rhoades
 S04E04 William Suff
 S04E05 Christopher Hightower
 S04E06 Sante Kimes & Kenneth Kimes
 S04E07 Richard Chase
 S04E08 Angel Maturino Resendiz
 S04E09 The Hillside Stranglers (Kenneth Bianchi & Angelo Buono Jr.)
 S04E010 Daniel Lee Siebert

Series 5
 S05E01 Lonnie Franklin
 S05E02 William Bonin
 S05E03 Jerry Brudos
 S05E04 Keith Jesperson
 S05E05 Arthur Shawcross
 S05E06 Doug Clark & Carol M. Bundy
 S05E07 Patrick Kearney
 S05E08 Dayton Leroy Rogers
 S05E09 Richard Roszkowski
 S05E010 Cesar Barone

Series 6
 S06E01 John Allen Muhammad & Lee Boyd Malvo
 S06E02 Robert Pickton
 S06E03 Sean Vincent Gillis
 S06E04 Donald Gene Miller
 S06E05 Judy Buenoano
 S06E06 Gary Ray Bowles
 S06E07 Derrick Todd Lee
 S06E08 Velma Barfield
 S06E09 Chester Turner
 S06E10 Genene Jones

Series 7
 S07E01 Jorge Avila-Torrez
 S07E02 Robert Hansen
 S07E03 Heriberto Seda
 S07E04 Charles Albright
 S07E05 Joshua Wade
 S07E06 Anthony Shore
 S07E07 Mark Goudeau
 S07E08 Paul Runge
 S07E09 Ronald Dominique
 S07E10 Paul Michael Stephani

See also
Most Evil

References

2017 British television series debuts
2020s British television series
English-language television shows
True crime television series
2010s British documentary television series
2020s British documentary television series
Television series about serial killers